Ferbane is a town on the north bank of the River Brosna in County Offaly, Ireland, between Birr and Athlone at the junction of the N62 National secondary road and the R436 regional road. The name of the town is said to come from the white bog cotton which grows in the surrounding Bog of Allen.

Ireland's first milled-peat fired power station was commissioned by the Electricity Supply Board (ESB) at Ferbane in 1957. Since the station's closure in 2001, the Shannon Development agency and the ESB have invested €1.4 million in a new business and technology park which opened in 2005.

History

Coole Castle
Sir John MaCoghlan built Coole Castle on the banks of the Brosna in 1575. It was the last of the MacCoghlan castles to be built. He erected it as a present to his second wife Sabina O'Dallachain. Formerly, there was a mural slab in the castle with a Latin inscription translated in English as "“This tower was built by the energy of Sir John MacCoghlan, K.T. chief of this Sept at the proper cost of Sabina O'Dallachain on the condition that she should have it for her lifetime and afterwards each of her sons according to their seniority".

The whereabouts of the mural is unknown at present.
In his will in 1590, Sir John left Coole Castle to his widow. Over the fireplace, in its original location, in the topmost room of the castle is a plaque written in Middle Irish which reads:

"SEAGHA (n) MAC (c) OCHL (ain) DO
TINDSCAIN O SEO SUAS 1575"
("Sean Mac Cochlan began (this building) from this (date) 1575")

Kilcolgan Castle (Court)
Terence Coghlan built Kilcolgan Castle in the early 1640s. In 1646, the Papal Nuncio was sent to Ireland; he stayed for some time in the castle and wrote admiringly of the castle demesne with its beautifully laid out gardens and peacocks strutting on the lawns. The castle continued to be in the possession of the MacCoghlans until the 18th century when it became uninhabited and fell into disrepair. The remains of the castle were demolished in 1954 and the stones used to make foundations for the power station at Lumcloon.

Gallen Priory

Less than a kilometre south of the town, on the site of an ancient monastery founded by the Welsh missionary Saint Canoc in 492, stands Gallen Priory (formerly a convent of the Sisters of Saint Joseph of Cluny, now a nursing home).

Community
In October 2007 Ferbane assembled, officially, 142 area residents to participate in a globally simultaneous dance to the music of Michael Jackson's Thriller. Awaiting the official word from Guinness World Records, this would be the world record; surpassing Toronto's 2006 record of 62.

Education 

All of Ferbane's primary and secondary schools have a Catholic ethos and are regulated by the Department of Education and Skills through the national curriculum. These include St. Cynocs National School, a national (primary) school which was founded in 2007 through the amalgamation of St. Mary's Boys NS and St. Mary's Girls NS.

Gallen Community School is the local secondary school and has been in existence since 2004 following the amalgamation of two former schools in the town. The school was newly rebuilt in 2011 under the DES Public Private Partnership scheme.

Sport
Ferbane GAA is the local Gaelic Athletic Association club. Tony McTague, one of Ferbane's most famous Gaelic footballers, won two All Irelands with Offaly in 1971 and 1972. He lifted the Sam Maguire Cup as captain in 1972.

Gallen Community school's senior team has won two All Ireland titles (in 2011 and 2016).

Transport
Ferbane is on the Bus Éireann bus route 72 which runs between Athlone and Limerick.

The closest train stations to Ferbane are Clara (17 km) and Athlone (19 km). Ferbane's former railway station (which opened in 1884), closed for passenger traffic in 1947 and closed altogether in 1963.

The Grand Canal, which links up with the River Shannon, passes through Gallen townland.

Amenity areas
The area comprising Ferbane industrial park is locally known as the "cow park" as it was once a municipal grazing area for local residents. In the summer of 2013 the forested area of Ferbane's industrial park was turned into a car free walking area. The area includes a short walk along the "mill race", a narrow waterway, and a footpath through a predominantly oak-forest. Many spruce mature pines can be found in the area also. The restoration work was commissioned by Ferbane's tidy town members.

Other local walking trails include the Offaly Way, a national Waymarked Trail which runs close to Ferbane town. It is a 37 km route that starts at Lemanaghan and finishes at Cadamstown. Lough Boora Discovery Park also has walking trails up to 22 km.

Library
Ferbane has a public library with children's and adults' sections. The library has computer access, printing services and free wifi.

See also
 List of towns and villages in Ireland.

References

External links
Offaly.ie - Ferbane (archived)
The Story of Gallen Priory (archived)
Ferbane Feis Ceoil

Towns and villages in County Offaly